Jami Masjid is a mosque that is present at the top of the hill at Bharuch Fort in Bharuch, Gujarat, India.

History 
The mosque was built in early 14th century. Remains of a Jain temple were used to built this mosque.

Architecture 
The mosque has an open courtyard with gateways and a prayer-chamber at its western side. The prayer-chamber is open pillared veranda which is divided into three compartments. Each compartment is formed by pillars supporting a large dome forming a mandapa. The mosque thus has three large domes, ten smaller domes and 48 pillars in total. There is no façade of arches there.

On the western wall, the qibla features pointed arches and Islamic motifs but are designed on patterns of niches in Hindu temples.

References 

Monuments of National Importance in Gujarat
Tourist attractions in Gujarat
Bharuch
Mosques completed in the 1320s